Teodor Bieregowoj (16 March 1908 – 1 January 1986) was a Polish racewalker. He competed in the men's 50 kilometres walk at the 1936 Summer Olympics.

Bieregowoj served in the Polish resistance movement during the Second World War.

References

External links
 

1908 births
1986 deaths
Athletes (track and field) at the 1936 Summer Olympics
Polish male racewalkers
Olympic athletes of Poland
Place of birth missing
Polish resistance members of World War II
Sportspeople from Lublin
20th-century Polish people